Kerry Keith Robinson (born October 3, 1973) is an American former professional Major League Baseball player.  Robinson started at an early age playing baseball and football for N.Y.A. (Northside Youth Association) and playing hockey for the Valley Stars in St. Louis, MO.  Robinson graduated from Hazelwood East High School and was a two sport star with brief playing time on the 1989 Missouri State 5A Championship team (Ranked #2 Nationally) and holds the highest career batting average (.517) in school history, and also for goals scored in a season (29) on the ice hockey team.  He went on to walk-on and play baseball at  Southeast Missouri State University, Where in his Senior season, he had an Ohio Valley Conference record 35-game hitting streak that at the time was the 13th longest in NCAA history. In 1996, he led the Midwest League with a .359 batting average and 50 stolen bases (a tie) and was second in the league in hits, triples, and runs while playing for Single-A Peoria.

Career
Robinson is known for a few distinct feats. He pinch hit for Mark McGwire in the 8th inning of the last game of McGwire's career, Game 5 of the 2001 National League Division Series. He is the only player in MLB history to wear both the numbers (00) 1999 Cincinnati Reds and (0) 2002-03 St.Louis Cardinals at some point in a career. He is also known from the book Three Nights in August where he delivered a game-winning, walk-off home run off Chicago Cubs' relief pitcher Mike Remlinger.

Robinson was originally drafted by the St. Louis Cardinals in 1995. His professional playing career lasted 12 years between the big leagues and minors.  Throughout his time in the minor leagues Robinson was able to tally up 322 stolen bases. His playing career ended in 2007, and he initially became a financial advisor. In November 2018, the Cardinals announced the comeback of the powder “victory” blue jerseys; this was Robinson's brain child and he played an integral role in convincing Cardinals president Bill DeWitt III.

References

External links 

1973 births
Living people
Arkansas Travelers players
Baseball players from St. Louis
Cincinnati Reds players
Columbus Clippers players
Durham Bulls players
Indianapolis Indians players
Johnson City Cardinals players
Kansas City Royals players
Louisville Redbirds players
Major League Baseball left fielders
Memphis Redbirds players
Omaha Royals players
Orlando Rays players
Pawtucket Red Sox players
Peoria Chiefs players
Portland Beavers players
St. Louis Cardinals players
St. Louis Cardinals scouts
San Diego Padres players
Southeast Missouri State Redhawks baseball players
Tacoma Rainiers players
Tampa Bay Devil Rays players
African-American baseball players